Malachi 2 is the second chapter of the Book of Malachi in the Hebrew Bible or the Old Testament of the Christian Bible. This book contains the prophecies attributed to the prophet Malachi, and is a part of the Book of the Twelve Minor Prophets.

Text 
The original text was written in Hebrew language. This chapter is divided into 17 verses.

Textual witnesses
Some early manuscripts containing the text of this chapter in Hebrew are of the Masoretic Text, which includes the Codex Cairensis (895), the Petersburg Codex of the Prophets (916), Aleppo Codex (10th century), Codex Leningradensis (1008). Fragments containing parts of this chapter were found among the Dead Sea Scrolls, that is, 4Q76 (4QXIIa; 150–125 BCE) with extant verses 10–17.

There is also a translation into Koine Greek known as the Septuagint, made in the last few centuries BCE. Extant ancient manuscripts of the Septuagint version include Codex Vaticanus (B; B; 4th century), Codex Sinaiticus (S; BHK: S; 4th century), Codex Alexandrinus (A; A; 5th century) and Codex Marchalianus (Q; Q; 6th century).

Structure
NKJV groups this chapter into:
 = Corrupt Priests
 = Treachery of Infidelity

Verse 7
 For the priest's lips should keep knowledge,
 and they should seek the law at his mouth:
 for he is the messenger of the Lord of hosts.
 "For the priest's lips should keep knowledge": It was the priest's duty to study the Law and to teach it faithfully, as it is said of Aaron, in Ecclus. 45:17, "He gave unto him his commandments, and authority in the statutes of judgments, that he should teach Jacob the testimonies, and inform Israel in his laws."

Verse 9
 Therefore have I also made you contemptible and base before all the people,
 according as ye have not kept my ways, but have been partial in the law.
 "have been partial in the law": in the observance of it, attending to the lesser, and taking no notice of the weightier matters of it, as the Jews are charged by Christ,  and in the interpretation of it, restraining its sense only to outward actions, for which they are reproved,  or "received faces", or "accepted persons in the law"; in matters of the law they were concerned in, they had respect to the persons of men, by giving the sense of it, and pronouncing judgment, in favour of some, to the prejudice of others, wrongly.

Verse 16
  For the Lord, the God of Israel, saith that he hateth putting away:
 for one covereth violence with his garment, saith the Lord of hosts:
 therefore take heed to your spirit, 
 that ye deal not treacherously.
 "He hateth putting away": This is another reason against divorce: God hates it. It is contrary to his original institution, and was only allowed for the hardness of men's hearts (see Deuteronomy 24:1, etc.; Matthew 19:3-9). Septuagint, "If thou hate her and dismiss her," etc.; Vulgate, "If thou hate her, put her away," which seems to encourage divorce, whereas in the context divorce is strongly condemned. Hence Jerome considers these words to be spoken by the Jews, quoting in their defence Moses' precept. Others think that they are ironical - Put her away, if you please; but you must bear the consequences.
 "One covereth violence with his garment": or, "and violence covereth his garment," or, it might be, in the same sense, "he covereth his garment with violence" , so that it cannot be hid, nor washed away, nor removed, but envelops him and his garment; and that, to his shame and punishment. It was, as it were, "an outer garment of violence", as Asaph says in Psalm 73:6, "violence covereth them as a garment;" or David in Psalm 109:18, "he clothed himself with cursing as with a garment." It was like a garment with "fretting leprosy," unclean and making unclean, to be burned with fire. Leviticus 13:47-58. Contrariwise, the redeemed saints had Revelation 7:14 "washed their robes and made them white in the Blood of the Lamb." Having declared God's hatred of this their doing, he sums up in the same words, but more briefly; "and this being so, ye shall take heed to your spirit, and not deal treacherously." Maurer translates, "And (Jehovah hateth him who) covereth his garment (that is, his wife, in Arabic idiom; compare Genesis 20:16, 'He is to thee a covering of thy eyes'; the husband was so to the wife, and the wife to the husband; also Deuteronomy 22:30; Ruth 3:9; Ezekiel 16:8) with injury." The Hebrew favors "garment," being accusative of the thing covered (as in Psalm 73:6). Their "violence" is the putting away of their wives; the "garment" with which they try to cover it is the plea of Moses' permission (Deuteronomy 24:1; compare Matthew 19:6-9).

See also

Related Bible parts: Matthew 5, Matthew 19, Matthew 23, Mark 10, Acts 20

Notes and references

Sources

External links

Jewish
Malachi 2 Hebrew with Parallel English
Malachi 2 Hebrew with Rashi's Commentary

Christian
Malachi 2 English Translation with Parallel Latin Vulgate

02